This article is intended to give an overview of the economy of Delaware.

Affluence

According to a 2013 study by Phoenix Marketing International, Delaware had the ninth-largest number of millionaires per capita in the United States, with a ratio of 6.20 percent.

Agriculture

Delaware's agricultural output consists of poultry, nursery stock, soybeans, dairy products and corn.

Industries
, the state's unemployment rate was 5.1%.

The state's largest employers are:
 government (State of Delaware, New Castle County)
 education (University of Delaware, Delaware Technical & Community College)
 banking (Bank of America, M&T Bank, JPMorgan Chase, Citigroup, Deutsche Bank)
 chemical, pharmaceutical, technology (DuPont de Nemours Inc., AstraZeneca, Syngenta, Agilent Technologies)
 healthcare (ChristianaCare, Bayhealth Medical Center, Nemours Children's Hospital, Delaware)
 farming, specifically chicken farming in Sussex County (Perdue Farms, Mountaire Farms, Allen Family Foods)
 retail (Walmart, Walgreens, Acme Markets)

Dover Air Force Base, located next to the state capital of Dover, is one of the largest Air Force bases in the country and is a major employer in Delaware. In addition to its other responsibilities in the United States Air Force Air Mobility Command, this air base serves as the entry point and mortuary for American military personnel and some U.S. government civilians who die overseas.

Industrial decline
Since the mid-2000s, Delaware has seen the departure of the state's automotive manufacturing industry (General Motors Wilmington Assembly and Chrysler Newark Assembly), the corporate buyout of a major bank holding company (MBNA), the departure of the state's steel industry (Evraz Claymont Steel), the bankruptcy of a fiber mill (National Vulcanized Fibre), and the diminishing presence of AstraZeneca in Wilmington.

In late 2015, DuPont announced that 1,700 employees, nearly a third of its footprint in Delaware, would be laid off in early 2016. The merger of E.I. du Pont de Nemours & Co. and Dow Chemical Company into DowDuPont took place on September 1, 2017.

Incorporation in Delaware

More than 50% of all U.S. publicly traded companies and 63% of the Fortune 500 are incorporated in Delaware. The state's attractiveness as a corporate haven is largely because of its business-friendly corporation law. Franchise taxes on Delaware corporations supply about one-fifth of its state revenue. Although "USA (Delaware)" ranked as the world's most opaque jurisdiction on the Tax Justice Network's 2009 Financial Secrecy Index, the same group's 2011 Index ranks the USA fifth and does not specify Delaware. In Delaware, there are more than a million registered corporations, meaning there are more corporations than people.

Food and drink
Title 4, chapter 7 of the Delaware Code stipulates that alcoholic liquor only be sold in specifically licensed establishments, and only between 9:00 am and 1:00 am. Until 2003, Delaware was among the several states enforcing blue laws and banned the sale of liquor on Sunday.

References